Alphabet is one of the most well-known poems of Inger Christensen, who was broadly considered to be Denmark's most prominent poet. An English language translation by Susanna Nied won the American-Scandinavian PEN Translation Prize in 1982.

Structure
Alphabet is a systematic poem, in which each of the fourteen sections of the poem is tied to a letter of the alphabet and the number of lines found in each section is dictated by the Fibonacci sequence. (The first section, "A", has one line. The last section, "N", has 610.)

Themes
Alphabet deals with themes of nuclear war and ecological devastation.

As the poem progresses and each section lengthens, an increasing number of elements related to destruction, death, and ecological devastation are introduced. The sections progress through the alphabet, finishing on the letter "N", for nuclear destruction, suggesting a premature end to the enumeration of splendours. The use of the Fibonacci sequence, Christensen later realised, was particularly appropriate for a plea that life can continue. "I found out after I had written alphabet that many plants follow these numbers. For example, sunflowers are ordered with the Fibonacci sequence - it's the way the seeds are placed."

Reception
The book was reviewed in Publishers Weekly in 2001: "As used here with controlled repetitions, the [Fibonacci] sequence gives the whole an almost medieval sense of restriction[.]  Abstracted cold war fears and post-'70s ecological concern and alienation give way to litanies of real world outrages ... which culminate in a post-nuclear holocaust nightmare, with birds and children somehow having survived in caves.  The scenario may seem dated, but the threats remain very real, and Christensen's poetic appeal for sanity and humanity remains an abstracted call to action."

See also
 1981 in poetry
 Danish literature

References

1981 poetry books
Books by Inger Christensen
Danish poetry collections
Gyldendal books
Nuclear war and weapons in popular culture
Ecopoetry
Fibonacci numbers